Steven Molony (born March 16) is an American actor, screenwriter, and film producer.  His film roles include Pinching Penny, for which he received the award for Best Leading Actor in a Feature Film from the 2011 Indie Fest.  He played both Dr. Jeremiah Arkham and Batman in the webseries The Joker Blogs.  He starred as identical twin brothers in the feature film Efficiency, for which he also wrote the screenplay. As a part of the film's fundraising on Kickstarter, Molony offered to perform randomly selected stunts for a $5 donation.  It went on to play at both Dances With Films and the Austin Film Festival. Both the film and Molony were awarded by the 2014 Accolade Global Film Competition for Best Feature Film and Best Performance by a Leading Actor, respectively.

His upcoming work includes Oxenfree and Valley of Bones.

External links

References 

1988 births
Living people
American male actors
American male screenwriters